Yugoslavia national football team results may refer to:

 Yugoslavia national football team results (1920–41)
 Yugoslavia national football team results (1946–69)
 Yugoslavia national football team results (1970–92)

See also
 Croatia national football team results
 Serbia national football team results